Justice Rose may refer to:

Christopher Rose (judge), judge on the Court of Appeal of England and Wales
Herschel H. Rose, justice of the Supreme Court of Appeals of West Virginia
Robert E. Rose, associate justice of the Supreme Court of Nevada
Robert R. Rose Jr., justice of the Wyoming Supreme Court
Roderick Rose, associate justice of the Supreme Court of the Dakota Territory
William B. Rose, justice of the Nebraska Supreme Court
Vivien Rose, judge on the Supreme Court of the United Kingdom